Bohemia Manor may refer to:

Chesapeake City, Maryland, previously known as Bohemia Manor
A former Jesuit plantation now consisting of only St. Francis Xavier Church in Warwick, Maryland